The Public Service Commission, West Bengal or PSCWB (Bengali: পশ্চিমবঙ্গ জনসেবা আয়োগ) is the state agency authorized to conduct the Civil Services Examination for entry-level appointments to the various Civil Services of state of West Bengal in India.

Constitutional status 

Articles 315 to 323 of Part XIV of the constitution, titled as Services Under the Union and the States, provide for a Public Service Commission for the Union and for each state.

Appointment

As per Article 316 of the Constitution of India provides that the chairman and other members of the commission shall be appointed by the Governor of West Bengal.

As per Article 319, a person who holds office as Chairman shall, on the expiration of his term of office, be ineligible for re-appointment to that office. But, a member other than the Chairman shall be eligible for appointment as the Chairman of the Commission.

Removal and suspension
As per Article 317, the Chairman or any other member of a Public Service Commission shall only be removed from their office by order of the President on the ground of "misbehaviour" after the Supreme Court, on reference being made to it by the President, has, on inquiry reported that the Chairman or such other member ought to be removed. The President may suspend the Chairman or other member of the Commission until report of the Supreme Court is received.

The President may also remove the Chairman or any other member of the commission if they:
 is adjudged an insolvent; or
 engages during their term of office in any paid employment outside the duties of their office; or
 is, in the opinion of the President, unfit to continue in office by reason of infirmity of mind or body.
 The Chairman or any other member cannot hold an office of profit or otherwise they shall be deemed to be guilty of misbehaviour.

Functions
As per Article 320, it shall be the duty of the State Public Service Commissions to conduct examinations for appointments to the services of the respective states. It shall also assist two or more States, if requested so, in framing and operating schemes of joint recruitment for any services.

The State Public Service Commission shall be consulted:
 on all matters relating to
 methods of recruitment to civil services and for civil posts
 making appointments to civil services and posts
 making promotions and transfers from one service to another
 the suitability of candidates for such appointments, promotions or transfers

Expenses 
As per Article 322, the expenses of the State Public Service Commission, including any salaries, allowances and pensions payable to or in respect of the members or staff of the Commission, shall be charged on the Consolidated Fund of the respective state.

Reporting 
As per Article 323, it will be the duty of a State Commission to present annually to the Governor of the State a report as to the work done by the Commission, and it shall be the duty of a Joint Commission to present annually to the Governor of each of the States the needs of which are served by the Joint Commission a report as to the work done by the Commission in relation to that State, and in either case the Governor, shall, on receipt of such report, cause a copy thereof together with a memorandum explaining, as respects the cases, if any, where the advice of the Commission was not accepted, the reasons for such nonacceptance to be laid before the Legislature of the State.

Members

Location
The office of the Public Service Commission, West Bengal is situated in Mudiali, Tollygunge area, Kolkata. The official address is 161A Shyama Prasad Mukherjee Road, Kolkata 700026.

Rabindra Sarobar metro station of Kolkata Metro Line 1 is the nearest metro station while Tollygunge railway station is the nearest railway station.

Services

  Only candidates who have pursued a law degree are eligible to appear in the exam.
  Candidates who hold a bachelor's degree in commerce are eligible to apply for this exam.
  Candidates who possess a bachelor's degree in some selected science streams are eligible to apply for this exam.

See also
 Civil Services of India
 Public service commissions in India
 Union Public Service Commission
 West Bengal Civil Service
 List of Public service commissions in India

References

External links
 Annual Report 2018-19

 Annual Report 2019-20

Government agencies established in 1937
State agencies of West Bengal
State public service commissions of India
1937 establishments in India